Kendall Trainor (born July 8, 1967) from Fredonia, Kansas is a former All-American placekicker for the University of Arkansas in 1988. 

He led the nation in field goals per game as a senior in 1988 under head coach Ken Hatfield. Trainor, in addition to setting five school records, was a first-team All-Southwest Conference selection following his senior year and a first-team All-American on teams selected by the American Football Coaches Association, the Associated Press, the Walter Camp Foundation and The Sporting News.

Trainor was also a letterman on the Razorback baseball team under coach Norm DeBryn.

Trainor was an All-State selection for Fredonia High School under head coach Gene John and led them to the 1983 Class 4A State Championship before he graduated in 1985.

In 2015 Trainor was inducted into the Arkansas Sports Hall of Honor. 

Trainor was the kicker for the New York/New Jersey Knights of the WLAF in 1991, hitting 12/14 extra point attempts and 9/16 field goal attempts, finishing the inaugural season of the World League with 39 points, fifth overall among kickers.

References

1967 births
Living people
All-American college football players
American football placekickers
Arkansas Razorbacks baseball players
Arkansas Razorbacks football players
New York/New Jersey Knights players
Sacramento Surge players
People from Fredonia, Kansas
Players of American football from Kansas